{{DISPLAYTITLE:C12H14N4O4S}}
The molecular formula C12H14N4O4S (molar mass: 310.33 g/mol, exact mass: 310.0736 u) may refer to:

 Sulfadimethoxine
 Sulfadoxine